Polygrammodes leptorrhapta is a moth in the family Crambidae. It was described by Edward Meyrick in 1936. It is found in the Democratic Republic of the Congo provinces of Kongo Central, Katanga, Kasai-Occidental and Kinshasa.

The larvae feed on Stereospermum kunthianum.

References

Spilomelinae
Moths described in 1936
Moths of Africa